Top-seeded Ivan Lendl overcame the defending champion, Andrés Gómez, in the final to claim his fifth title of the year and $51,000 prize money.

Seeds
The top eight seeds received a bye into the second round. A champion seed is indicated in bold text while text in italics indicates the round in which that seed was eliminated.

  Ivan Lendl (champion)
  Andrés Gómez (final)
  Boris Becker (semifinals)
  Yannick Noah (semifinals)
  Miloslav Mečíř (quarterfinals)
  Aaron Krickstein (second round)
  José Luis Clerc (third round)
  Martín Jaite (quarterfinals)
  Libor Pimek (third round)
  Guillermo Vilas (third round)
  Francesco Cancellotti (third round)
  Hans Schwaier (quarterfinals)
  Mark Dickson (second round)
  Juan Aguilera (first round)
  Guy Forget (third round)
  Horacio de la Peña (first round)

Draw

Finals

Top half

Section 1

Section 2

Bottom half

Section 3

Section 4

References

External links

1985 Grand Prix (tennis)
Men's Singles